The Pedir Expedition (Dutch: Pedir-expeditie) was a punitive expedition of the Royal Netherlands East Indies Army against Pedir (Acheh) in 1897 and 1898.

Sources
1898. Bintang Djaoeh. Pedir en de aanstaande expeditie (met een overzichtskaart van Atjeh). Eigen Haard. Bladzijde 362-365.
1898. Bintang Djaoeh. De Pedir-expeditie (Selimoen). Eigen Haard. Bladzijde 376-379, 388-390 en 410-413
1898. In memoriam. Luitenant J. Goldenberg. Eigen Haard. Bladzijde 459.

Aceh War
Dutch conquest of Indonesia
1897 in the Dutch East Indies